Aberdeen F.C. competed in Scottish Football League First
Division and Scottish Cup in season 1912–1913.

Overview

Aberdeen finished in seventh place in Division One in their ninth season in the Scottish league. They were knocked out of the Scottish Cup at the second round stage by Second Division club Dumbarton. Dave Main finished as league top scorer with ten goals. A club record low attendance of 300 was set in a League game against Queen's Park in September 1912.

Results

Scottish Division One

Final standings

Inter City Midweek League

Scottish Cup

Squad

Appearances and goals

|}

Notes

References

1912-13
Aberdeen